Mother of vinegar is a biofilm composed of a form of cellulose, yeast and bacteria that sometimes develops on fermenting alcoholic liquids during the process that turns alcohol into acetic acid with the help of oxygen from the air and acetic acid bacteria. It is similar to the SCOBY mostly known from production of kombucha, but develops to a much lesser extent due to lesser availability of yeast (which is often no longer present in wine/cider at this stage) and a different population of bacteria. Mother of vinegar is often added to wine, cider, or other alcoholic liquids to produce vinegar at home, although only the bacteria is required, but historically has also been used in large scale production.

Mother of vinegar is also known as Mycoderma aceti, a New Latin expression, from the Greek μύκης ("fungus") plus δέρμα ("skin"), and the Latin aceti ("of the acid").

Mother of vinegar can also form in store-bought vinegar if there is some residual sugar, leftover yeast and bacteria and/or alcohol contained in the vinegar. This is more common in unpasteurized vinegar, since the pasteurization might not stabilize the process completely. While not necessarily appetizing in appearance, mother of vinegar is completely harmless and the surrounding vinegar does not have to be discarded because of it. It can be filtered out using a coffee filter, used to start a bottle of vinegar, or simply ignored.

See also

 Acetobacter
 Fulvic acid
 SCOBY
 Turbatrix aceti - vinegar eels

References

Food science
Vinegar